Margaret Thatcher (1925–2013) served as Prime Minister of the United Kingdom from 1979 to 1990.

Margaret Thatcher may also refer to:

In fiction
 Inspector Margaret Thatcher, a character on the television series Due South
 Margaret Thatcher, a character in the television series The Adventures of Tom Sawyer
 "Margaret Thatcher", an episode of The Mindy Project

Other
 Margaret Doris Thatcher (née Kempson, 1918–1996), first wife of Denis Thatcher

See also
 
 
 Iron Lady (disambiguation)
 Thatcher (disambiguation)